= Walter Bristow =

American politician

Member of the South Carolina Senate
- In office 1958–1976

Member of the South Carolina House of Representatives
- In office 1956–1958

Personal details
- Born: October 14, 1924 Columbia, South Carolina, U.S.
- Died: November 30, 2013 (aged 89) Columbia, South Carolina, U.S.
- Education: University of North Carolina (B.A.); University of South Carolina (LLB); Harvard Law School (LLM)
- Profession: Legislator, judge

Walter Bristow (October 14, 1924 to November 30, 2013) was an American politician. He was a member of the South Carolina Senate serving from 1958 to 1976 and was a member of the South Carolina House of Representatives from 1956 to 1958.

Among his legislative activities, Bristow was a proponent for the establishment of a South Carolina Commission for the Blind, introducing a bill to establish such an entity as early as January 12, 1965.
